Michael Bruce Ross (July 26, 1959 – May 13, 2005) was an American serial killer. In 2005, he was executed by the state of Connecticut. Connecticut ended capital punishment in 2012, and the Connecticut Supreme Court ruled capital punishment unconstitutional in 2015, converting the sentences of the state's remaining death row inmates to life in prison without parole.

Early life 
Ross was born in Putnam, Connecticut, on July 26, 1959, to Patricia Hilda Laine and Dan Graeme Ross. He was the oldest of four children, having two younger sisters and a younger brother. The family lived on a chicken farm in Brooklyn, Connecticut. Ross's home life was extremely dysfunctional; his mother, who abandoned the family at least once, had been institutionalized and beat all four of her children, saving the worst treatment for him. Some family and friends have suggested that he was also molested by his teenaged uncle, who committed suicide when Ross was six.

He was a bright boy who performed well in school. He graduated from Killingly High School in Killingly, Connecticut, in 1977, and graduated from Cornell University in Ithaca, New York, where he studied economics, in May 1981. He became an insurance salesman. He exhibited antisocial behavior from a young age. Ross began stalking women in his sophomore year of college and, in his senior year, he committed his first rape followed by his first murder soon after.

Crime spree 

Between 1981 and 1984, Ross murdered eight girls and women aged between 14 and 25 in Connecticut and New York. He raped seven out of his eight murder victims. He also was alleged to have raped, but not killed, a 21-year-old woman named Vivian Dobson in 1983 and a woman named Candace Farris in Indiana. Plainfield police rejected the possibility that Ross had been Vivian Dobson's rapist. They did not press charges and Ross made no confession.

Ross confessed to the eight murders and was convicted for the last four of them. He was sentenced to death on July 6, 1987, in Connecticut by judge G. Sarsfield Ford. In 2001, while on death row, Ross pleaded guilty to first degree manslaughter for killing Paula Perrera in New York in 1982, and was sentenced to 8 and 1/3 to 25 years in prison. He spent almost 18 years on death row before his execution in May 2005.

Victims 

 Dzung Ngoc Tu (age 25)  May 12, 1981. Cornell University student
 Tammy Williams (17)  January 5, 1982. Brooklyn, Connecticut 
 Paula Perrera (16)  March 1982. Middletown, New York
 Debra Smith Taylor (23)   June 15, 1982. Griswold, Connecticut  
 Robin Dawn Stavinsky (19)   October 23, 1983. Norwich, Connecticut 
 April Brunais (14)   April 22, 1984. Griswold, Connecticut
 Leslie Shelley (14)   April 22, 1984. Griswold, Connecticut
 Wendy Baribeault (17)  June 13, 1984. Griswold, Connecticut

Imprisonment
During his incarceration, he met his fiancée, Susan Powers, of Oklahoma. Powers broke up with Ross in 2003 but still visited him until his death. He became a devout Catholic after his arrest in 1984, meeting regularly with two priests through the years and praying the rosary each morning. During his time in prison, Ross translated documents into Braille, acted as a mentor to other inmates, and financially sponsored a child from the Dominican Republic.

Execution 
Although he opposed the death penalty, Ross strongly supported his own death sentence in the last year of his life, saying that he wanted to spare his victims' families any more pain. According to Kathry Yeager, a Cornell graduate, Ross believed that he had been "forgiven by God" and that he would be going to "a better place" once he was executed. She said: "He's not being punished. He's moving on to life eternal. That's what is ironic about the death penalty. He's looking forward to the peace."

Yeager also said that Ross had come to believe there was no way his death sentences would be commuted without forcing the victims' families to suffer through more legal hearings, and that he knew his life would be meaningful, even behind bars: "He's had a horrible life, and he's wanted to do good."   In spite of this, an hour before the execution was to take place in the early hours of January 26, 2005, Ross's lawyer, acting on behalf of Ross's father, obtained a two-day stay of execution.

Ross was then scheduled to die by lethal injection on January 29, 2005, at 2:01 a.m. Eastern Standard Time. However, earlier in the day, the execution was again postponed because of doubts that Ross was mentally competent; having fought against his death sentence for 17 years, he suddenly waived his right to appeal.  His attorney claimed that Ross was incompetent to waive appeals, as he was suffering from death row syndrome.  In his final days, Ross became an oblate, or associate, of the Benedictine Grange, a Roman Catholic monastic community in West Redding, Connecticut.

Ross was executed by lethal injection on May 13, 2005, at Osborn Correctional Institution in Somers, Connecticut. He was 45 years old. Ross did not request a special last meal before facing his execution, thereby dining on the regular prison meal of the day: turkey à la king with rice, mixed vegetables, white bread, fruit, and a beverage. When asked if he would like to make a last statement, he said, without opening his eyes, "No, thank you." Ross was pronounced dead at 2:25 a.m. His remains were buried at the Benedictine Grange Cemetery in Redding, Connecticut.

After execution
After the execution, Dr. Stuart Grassian, a psychiatrist who had argued that Ross was not competent to waive appeal, received a letter from Ross dated May 10, 2005, which read "Check, and mate. You never had a chance!"  Ross's execution was the first in Connecticut and in all of New England since 1960. It was also the first and only execution in Connecticut administered by lethal injection. As of June 2020, Ross is the last inmate executed in Connecticut; the death penalty was abolished in Connecticut on April 25, 2012.

Vivian Dobson, whom Ross was alleged to have raped, became a vocal opponent of the death penalty in an effort to save Ross's life. The execution of Ross was the first in Connecticut in 2005, the first execution in Connecticut since 1960, the 22nd execution in the United States in 2005, and the 966th execution in the United States since 1976. Ross was a suspect in rapes and murders in the state of Indiana.  Candace Farris, while vacationing in Indiana, was allegedly taken at gunpoint and raped, yet managed to escape and was later found by her friends in a nearby cornfield, distraught and without clothing.  Her friends had seen her driving off with a man that fit Michael Bruce Ross' description.

Popular culture
Michael Ross appeared in a British television series about serial killers in 1995. The filmmakers who produced the segment gave him the nickname "The Roadside Strangler" because the other killers in the series had nicknames. One of the producers of the series said the name may have been the result of a brainstorming session at a motel bar.  Ross was not called "The Roadside Strangler" by the Connecticut media or by local law enforcement while he was alive.

In 2015, The Man in the Monster: An Intimate Portrait of a Serial Killer, a detailed account of Ross's killing spree, capture, trial, time in prison and execution, was published by Penguin Press. Written by former Columbia School of Journalism professor Martha Elliott, the book documents the ten-year telephone and prison visit relationship that developed between the author and her subject. Generally well received, the book garnered positive reviews by Library Journal, Kirkus Reviews, The Boston Globe, Booklist and The National Book Review.  Elliott's experience with Ross was featured on Criminal, a Radiotopia podcast on crime, in Episode 34: The Stay.

Podcasts 
 Murderous States Of Mind – Episode #6 and #7: Michael Ross AKA The Roadside Strangler pt. 1 & 2 https://msomindpod.buzzsprout.com/
 Serial Killers – The Roadside Strangler Michael Bruce Ross pt. 1 & 2

See also 

 List of most recent executions by jurisdiction
 List of people executed in Connecticut
 List of people executed in the United States in 2005
 List of serial killers in the United States

References

External links 
 8-2-Lethal-injection-table.jpg Photograph of Connecticut Lethal Injection Table
 It's Time for Me to Die By Michael B. Ross, in Whole Earth Review, Fall 1999

1959 births
2005 deaths
20th-century American criminals
21st-century executions by Connecticut
21st-century executions of American people
American murderers of children
American rapists
Catholics from Connecticut
Converts to Roman Catholicism
Cornell University alumni
Crimes in Connecticut
Executed American serial killers
Executed people from Connecticut
Male serial killers
People convicted of murder by Connecticut
People executed by Connecticut by lethal injection
People from Putnam, Connecticut
Violence against women in the United States